William Johnston defeated Maurice McLoughlin 1–6, 6–0, 7–5, 10–8 in the final to win the men's singles tennis title at the 1915 U.S. National Championships.  The event was held at the West Side Tennis Club in Forest Hills, New York in the United States.

Draw

Finals

References

External links
 1915 U.S. National Championships on ITFtennis.com, the source for this draw

Men's singles
1916